Plagerepne is a monotypic genus of moths in the family Nolidae. It has been listed as a genus in the families Noctuidae and Pyralidae by other authors.

Its one species, Plagerepne torquata, can be found in Sundaland, Borneo and Myanmar.

References
 

Chloephorinae
Moths of Borneo